Johnny Ngan Kwok Leung (born 7 April 1949 in Hong Kong) is a Hong Kong film actor and television actor. He was an actor for ATV from 1980–1981 before joining TVB.

Acting career
Johnny Ngan earned his nickname "Young Master Jack (積少)" after appearing in his first TVB drama Hong Kong 81 as "Jack Chan (陳積)".

In 1987, he acted in The Seasons, a popular drama series shown during Enjoy Yourself Tonight.

From 1995–1999, he acted in the hit TVB soap opera A Kindred Spirit. His performance as the middle-aged "Chan Tai Sing (陳大勝)" attracted young viewers' attention. Since this drama, he has gotten to appear in more dramas with more screen time.

Aside from dramas, he also appeared in the popular variety show, Enjoy Yourself Tonight and a few Hong Kong movies.

Incident
On the set of The Seasons, there was a scene in which his wife (portrayed by Meg Lam) was to slap him. Lam slapped him too hard, which caused injury on his neck. Ngan was hospitalized for a month.

Personal life
Ngan is a practitioner of T'ai chi ch'uan. He is currently also a T'ai chi ch'uan instructor.

Filmography

TVB dramas

ATV dramas

Films

External links
 Aan Kwok-Leung at the Hong Kong Movie Database

1949 births
Living people
20th-century Hong Kong male actors
Hong Kong male film actors
Hong Kong male television actors
Chinese tai chi practitioners
Hong Kong wushu practitioners
Hong Kong kung fu practitioners
21st-century Hong Kong male actors
TVB veteran actors